Orthenches saleuta is a moth of the family Plutellidae first described by Edward Meyrick in 1913. It is endemic to New Zealand.

References

Plutellidae
Moths of New Zealand
Moths described in 1913
Endemic fauna of New Zealand
Taxa named by Edward Meyrick
Endemic moths of New Zealand